Radio Caracas may refer to:

Radio Caracas Radio, a Venezuelan radio network
Radio Caracas Televisión Internacional, a Venezuelan cable television network